Fu Yanlong (born 23 June 1988) is a Paralympian athlete from China competing mainly in F42 classification throwing events.

Athletics history
Fu represented China at the 2012 Summer Paralympics in London, entering the discus and Javelin throw events (F42). In the discus he finished ninth, but a throw of 52.79 metres in the javelin gave him a Paralympic gold medal. As well as the Paralympics Hou has also been part of two Chinese teams to compete at the IPC Athletics World Championships, in 2013 in Lyon and 2015 in Doha. In Lyon he won the silver in the F42 javelin.

Personal history
Fu was born in Jilin, China in 1988. At the age of one he was diagnosed with polio, which has resulted in an impairment to his leg.

Notes

Paralympic athletes of China
Athletes (track and field) at the 2012 Summer Paralympics
Paralympic gold medalists for China
Living people
Medalists at the 2012 Summer Paralympics
Chinese male discus throwers
Chinese male javelin throwers
Chinese male shot putters
Athletes from Jilin
1988 births
Paralympic medalists in athletics (track and field)
21st-century Chinese people
Medalists at the 2010 Asian Para Games
Medalists at the 2014 Asian Para Games
Medalists at the World Para Athletics Championships